The Österman Brothers' Virago (Swedish: Bröderna Östermans huskors) may refer to:

 The Österman Brothers' Virago a 1913 play by Oscar Wennersten
 The Österman Brothers' Virago (1925 film), a silent film adaptation directed by William Larsson
 The Österman Brothers' Virago (1932 film), a Swedish film adaptation directed by Thure Alfe
 The Österman Brothers' Virago (1945 film), a Swedish film adaptation directed by Ivar Johansson

See also
 En pige uden lige, a 1943 Danish version of the play directed by Jon Iversen